The Koibal are one of the subdivisions of the Khakass people of Southern Siberia.  Although they speak the Turkic Khakas language, the Koibal have mixed ancestry and used to speak the Kamas language, which is now extinct.  They formed in the late 19th century from the merger of the Abugach, Baikot, Kandyk, Tarazhak, Kol and Arsh peoples.  Most of these people are believed to have been of ancestry more closely related to Samoyedic peoples than to Turkics. Koibals live in the Beysky District of Khakassia

Prior to the rise of Communism the Koibal were officially Russian Orthodox.  However they had retained many Shamanist and Animist customs.

References

Sources
 Wixman, Ronald. The Peoples of the USSR: An Ethnographic Handbook. (Armonk, New York: M. E. Sharpe, Inc., 1984) p. 109.

Ethnic groups in Russia
Khakas